Angel Josué Chibozo (born 1 July 2003) is a Beninese professional footballer who plays as a forward for Primera Federación club Real Murcia, on loan from Juventus, and the Beninese national team.

Club career

Early career 
Born in Benin, Chibozo moved to Italy in 2014. He started playing football aged 11 at Inter Milan's youth sector in 2014, before joining Giana Erminio in January 2017.

Juventus 
Chibozo signed for Juventus in summer 2017. On 9 October 2021, Chibozo made his unofficial debut for the first team in a 2–1 friendly win against Alessandria, coming on as substitute in the 63rd minute and scoring the winning goal 30 minutes later. With eight appearances, Chibozo helped the U19s reach the 2021–22 UEFA Youth League semifinals, their best-ever placing in the competition. He scored against Malmö FF and against Zenit in the group stage and he scored against Liverpool in the quarter-finals and against Benfica in the semi-finals. Chibozo ended the season with 21 goals scored in all competitions.

Amiens and Real Murcia (loans) 
On 1 July 2022, Chibozo left Juventus and joined Ligue 2 side Amiens on loan with option to buy.

He subsequently made his professional debut on 30 July, coming in as a substitute for Mamadou Fofana at the 76th minute of a 3-0 league loss against Metz.

On 31 January 2023, Chibozo was recalled by Juventus and subsequently joined Spanish club Real Murcia on loan until the end of the season.

International career 
On 14 March 2022, Chibozo received his first senior call-up from the Beninese national team. He then made his international debut on 27 March, featuring in a 2–1 win against Zambia.

Style of play 
Chibozo is a forward, who can play on the left or centrally. His main attributes are his pace, his ability as a free-kick taker, his dribbling and his technique.

Career statistics

International

External links

References 

2003 births
Living people
Beninese footballers
Association football forwards
Inter Milan players
A.S. Giana Erminio players
Juventus F.C. players
Amiens SC players
Real Murcia players
Ligue 2 players
Beninese expatriate footballers
Beninese expatriate sportspeople in Italy
Expatriate footballers in Italy
Beninese expatriate sportspeople in France
Expatriate footballers in France
Beninese expatriate sportspeople in Spain
Expatriate footballers in Spain